Raphael Carl Rattray QC (18 September 1929 – 14 March 2012) was a Jamaican jurist and politician.

Rattray was born in 1929 in St. Elizabeth. He began his career in law in England before being called to the Jamaica Bar in 1958. In 1969, he was appointed a Queen's Counsel. He was also a founder of the law firm of Rattray, Patterson, Rattray.

Political career

Rattray was one of the founding members of the People's National Party as well as a founding member and past chairman of the Jamaica Council for Human Rights.

From 1978 to 1980, Rattray was the leader of government business in the Senate. In 1989, he was elected as the MP for the constituency of South East St Catherine.

Rattray served as the Attorney General from 1976 to 1980 and from 1989 to 1993. During the latter term, he concurrently served as the Minister of Justice from 1989 to 1992 and subsequently as the Minister Legal Affairs from 1992 to 1993.

In 1993, Rattray was appointed as President of the Court of Appeal. He served in this capacity until 1999, when he retired from the bench.

Death

On 14 March 2012, Rattray died at his home on St. Andrew. He was 82 years of age and had been ailing for the previous four years. He was survived by his wife, Audrey, two sons and two daughters.

References

1929 births
2012 deaths
Government ministers of Jamaica
Members of the Senate of Jamaica
Members of the House of Representatives of Jamaica
People's National Party (Jamaica) politicians
Jamaican Queen's Counsel
Attorneys General of Jamaica
Justice ministers of Jamaica